The waist-level finder (WLF), also called waist-level viewfinder (WLVF), is a type of viewfinder that can be used on twin lens and single lens reflex cameras. While it is typically found on older medium format cameras, some newer and/or 35 mm cameras have this type of finder (perhaps as an option).

In the reflex camera, the light from the lens is projected onto a focusing screen. The waist-level finder makes this screen viewable from above, where the image is seen upright but reversed left-to-right. This allows the camera user to determine the target area while holding the camera below eye level.

The eye-level finder is an evolution of the waist-level finder, using a roof pentaprism or pentamirror to correct the image while making it viewable through an eyepiece at the rear of the camera.

Some digital cameras have an articulating screen or a swivel lens, this allows the screen to be angled to make it viewable at waist-level. With live preview the screen can be used as a viewfinder.

Advantages 

 The photographer is looking down into the camera, attracting less attention compared to an eye-level finder. This makes it better for street or candid photography.
 Even when they know they are being photographed, the subject may feel less "targeted" because the photographer is not looking at them.
 The camera is often held against the belly or resting on something (e.g. table, the lap, etc.), resulting in less motion blur.

Disadvantages 

 The image is reversed left-to-right, making it tricky to follow moving subjects.

See also
Articulating screen — similar functionality for digital cameras

References

Camera features